Islam is a minority faith in Thailand, with statistics suggesting 4.9 percent of the population are Muslim. Figures as high as 5 percent of Thailand's population have also been mentioned.  Most Thai Muslims are Sunni Muslims, although Thailand has a diverse population that includes immigrants from around the world.

Demographics and geography
Popular opinion seems to hold that a vast majority of the country's Muslims are found in Thailand's four southernmost provinces of Satun, Yala, Pattani and Narathiwat, where they make up majority of the population. However, the Thai Ministry of Foreign Affairs' research indicates that only 18 percent of Thai Muslims live in those four provinces. The rest are scattered throughout Thailand, with the largest concentrations being in Bangkok and throughout the southern region.

According to the National Statistics Office, in 2005, Muslims in Southern Thailand made up 30.4 percent of the general population above the age 15, while less than three percent in other parts of the country.

History

Muslim merchant communities resided in Thailand as early as the 9th century.

In early modern Thailand, Muslims from the Coromandel Coast served as eunuchs in the Thai palace and court. Thailand, as Siam, was known for religious tolerance, and there were Muslims working for the Siamese Royal Governments throughout the eras. This culture of tolerance in Siam and later Thailand resulted in the great diversity of Islam in Thailand.

Malay separatism in South Thailand is mostly a war based on ethnicity, as Malays in the region have sought to separate from Thailand, although extremist Muslim groups are involved in the conflict.

Ethnicity and identity

Thailand's Muslim population is diverse, with ethnic groups having migrated from as far as China, Pakistan, Cambodia, Bangladesh, Malaysia, and Indonesia, as well as including ethnic Thais, while about two-thirds of Muslims in Thailand are Thai Malays.

Indigenous Thai
Many Thai Muslims are ethnically and linguistically Thai, who are either hereditary Muslims, Muslims by intermarriage, or recent converts to the faith. Ethnic Thai Muslims live mainly in the central and southern provinces - varying from entire Muslim communities to mixed settlements.

Former Commander-in-Chief of the Royal Thai Army General Sonthi Boonyaratglin is an example of an indigenous Thai Muslim. Sonthi is of remote Persian ancestry. His ancestor, Sheikh Ahmad of Qom, was an Iranian expatriate trader who lived in the Ayutthaya Kingdom for 26 years. Many Thais, including those of the Bunnag and Ahmadchula families trace their ancestry back to him. Sri Sulalai was a princess of the royal family of the Sultanate of Singora. Rama II of Siam took her as a concubine.

In 1946 Prince Bhumibol Adulyadej and Ananda Mahidol, Rama VIII, toured the Tonson Mosque.

Malay Muslims

In the three southernmost border provinces, the vast majority of the local Muslim population is predominantly Malay, amounting to about 80 percent of the region's population. Thai Malays speak Kelantan-Pattani Malay, which is in a different language from the Malay language. 

The high number of Malay origin inhabitants in the southern region is due to the historical nature of the area, which contains parts of the Pattani Kingdom, an Islamic Malay kingdom established in the 19th century, but later annexed to Siam since the early Ayutthaya Kingdom. Similarly, there is an ethnic Thai minority in northern Malaysia.

Chinese Muslims

In the far north, as well as in select central and southern urban areas, there are pockets of Thai Muslims of Hui (ethnic Chinese Muslim) origin. Most Chinese Muslims belong to a group of people called Chin Haw in Thai, although most Chin Haw are not Muslims. Some historians believe that the name Chin Haw can be explained to be a combination of "Chin" (China) and "Ho" (Hui). The Chin Haw thus can be seen as traders and émigrés who carried with them Hui traditions from China. One of the best known Chinese mosques is Ban Ho Mosque in Chiang Mai Province.

Muslim groups
Ethnic groups including the Rohingya are found in Thailand's refugee camps, rural fishing villages, as well as in many small towns and cities close to the Myanmar border.

As well as being home to many Chinese Muslims, Northern Thailand is home to many Burmese and mixed Chinese-Burmese or Pakistani-Burmese peoples.

Other Asian Muslim groups

Other represented groups include Muslim Chams, originally from Vietnam since 15th century, who can be found between the mutual border and Bangkok as well as the deep south. In the 1700s and 1800s Vietnam and Cambodia-based Chams settled in Bangkok.

Other groups include Middle Easterners such as Arabs and South Asians (especially Indians, Pakistanis and Bangladeshis) and Indonesian Muslims, especially Bugis, Javanese and Minangkabau.

According to a 1685 account of a Persian diplomat as well as notes of the French traveller Guy Tachard, there was a substantial Persian Shi'i community in Thailand at the time, with ritual ta'zieh performances subsidised by the king. There are Muslims of Persian origin that reside in the Bangkok area.

Distinctiveness of Thai Islam
 
Generally believers of the Islamic faith in Thailand follow certain customs and traditions associated with traditional Islam influenced by Sufism.

For Thai Muslims, like their co-religionists in Southeast Asia's other Buddhist-majority countries, Mawlid is a symbolic reminder of the historical presence of Islam in the country. It also represents an annual opportunity to reaffirm Muslims' status as Thai citizens and their allegiance to the monarchy.

The Islamic faith in Thailand, often reflects Sufi beliefs and practices, as in other Asian countries like Bangladesh, India, Pakistan, Indonesia and Malaysia. The Ministry of Culture's Islamic Department gives awards to Muslims who have contributed to the promotion and development of Thai life in their roles as citizens, as educators and as social workers. In Bangkok, the Ngarn Mawlid Klang main festival is a vibrant showcase for the Thai Muslim community and their lifestyles.

Places of worship

According to the National Statistics Office of Thailand in 2007, the country had 3494 mosques, with the largest number, 636, in Pattani Province. According to the Religious Affairs Department (RAD), 99 percent of the mosques are associated with Sunni Islam with the remaining one percent Shi'i Islam.

Governance and education

Chularatchamontri (จุฬาราชมนตรี) is the title of Shaykh al-Islām in Thailand. The title was first used in the Ayutthaya Kingdom when King Songtham (1611–1628) appointed Sheikh Ahmad to the office. Pursuant to the current Islamic Organ Administration Act, BE 2540 (1997), Chularatchamontri is appointed by the king upon advice of the prime minister. He has the authority to administer all Islamic affairs in the nation and to provide advice on Islamic affairs to governmental agencies. Chularatchamontri vacates his office upon death, resignation and removal by the king upon the advice of the prime minister. Islamic law is implemented in the four southern provinces with Muslim majorities, where it applies only in cases concerning family and inheritance among Muslim residents.

There is also a Central Islamic Council of Thailand (คณะกรรมการกลางอิสลามแห่งประเทศไทย) (CICOT) (กอท.), consisting of at least five councillors appointed by the king. The CICOT advises the Minister of Education and the Minister of Interior on Islamic matters. Its presiding officer is Chularatchamontri. Provincial Islamic Councils (คณะกรรมการอิสลามประจำจังหวัด) exist in the provinces that had substantial Muslim minorities. There are other links between the government and the Muslim community, including government financial assistance to Islamic education institutions, assistance with construction of some of the larger mosques, and the funding of pilgrimages by Thai Muslims to Mecca, both Bangkok and Hat Yai being primary gateway cities.

Thailand also maintains several hundred Islamic schools at the primary and secondary levels, as well as Islamic banks, including the Islamic Bank of Thailand, shops and other institutions. Much of Thailand's packaged food is tested and labelled halal if applicable.

See also
 South Thailand insurgency
 Islam by country
 List of mosques in Thailand
 Pattani Kingdom
 Hidayatuddeneyah Mosque

References

Further reading

External links

 Islamic Schools in Thailand
 The First Islamic Website in Thailand
  Islam in Thailand
 "The Muslim Fishermen of Phang Nga" by Antonio Graceffo
 Global Security - Thailand
 islam.in.th
 Hidayatuddeneyah Mosque
 Papers on Islam in Thailand by Imtiyaz Yusuf

 
Thailand